Rajesh Lahanu Kashiwar also known as Bala Kashiwar is a member of the 13th Maharashtra Legislative Assembly. He represents the Sakoli Assembly Constituency. He belongs to the Bharatiya Janata Party (BJP) He has been described as amongst the "young face of BJP" in the assembly. His victory was part of a clean sweep made by BJP in Bhandara district.

In February 2012, he was member of the Bhandara Zilla Parishad representing Ekodi Zilla Parishad Constituency .

References

Maharashtra MLAs 2014–2019
People from Bhandara district
Maharashtra district councillors
Year of birth missing (living people)
Living people
Marathi politicians
Bharatiya Janata Party politicians from Maharashtra